Dorie Ann Ladner (born 1942) is an American civil rights activist.

Early life
Dorie Ladner was born in Hattiesburg, Mississippi on June 28, 1942. In high school, Ladner joined the NAACP Youth Council in Hattiesburg. In this organization, she met NAACP state president Medgar Evers.

Education 
Ladner was expelled from Jackson State University in 1961 for her support of the Tougaloo Nine. Dorie and her sister Joyce Ladner were invited to enroll at Tougaloo College. In 1973, Ladner earned her B.A. degree from Tougaloo College, and in 1975, she earned a master's degree in social work (MSW) from the Howard University School of Social Work.

Activism
In 1961, Ladner became engaged with the Freedom Riders. She joined the Student Nonviolent Coordinating Committee (SNCC) and was arrested in 1962 trying to integrate the Woolworth lunch counter in downtown Jackson.

Dorie was jailed for picketing in the 1962 Jackson, Mississippi boycotts:

In August 1963, Dorie took part in the March on Washington in response to the June assassination of Medgar Evers.

In 1964, she became a key organizer in the Freedom Summer Project. She became the first woman to head a COFO Council of Federated Organizations project in 1964. She served as the SNCC project director in Natchez, Mississippi (1964-1966).

Current work
She currently lives in Washington, D.C. where she is frequently invited to speak on panels and interviewed for documentary film projects. For example, in 2014 she was interviewed for the American Experience PBS documentary on Freedom Summer and she spoke on a panel with Stanley Nelson Jr. and Khalil Gibran Muhammad, hosted by New America in New York. In August 2017, Ladner was one of the panelists for a workshop called "SNCC: Civil Right Activism to DC Statehood" at the National Lawyers Guild 80th annual convention in Washington, D.C. along with Judy Richardson, Courtland Cox, Frank Smith, and others. In October 2017, Ladner took part in a discussion after the screening of the short film This Little Light of Mine: The Legacy of Fannie Lou Hamer. The other panelists included filmmaker Robin Hamilton and Kim Jeffries Leonard, President and CEO of Envision Consulting and Member of LINKS, Inc., in a discussion of women activists during the Civil Rights Movement.

Recognition
 2011: "Humanitarian Award" from Fannie Lou Hamer National Institute of Citizenship and Democracy
 May 18, 2014: Awarded an honorary doctorate from Tougaloo College.
 October 23, 2015: Natchez, MS designates Dorie Ladner Day
 2016: "Well-Behaved Women Don't Make 'Her-Story': The Dorie Ladner Story" documentary produced by Kendall Little.
 June 2017: Awarded an honorary doctorate from the University of the District of Columbia.

Filmography

References

External links
 SNCC Digital Gateway: Dorie Ladner, Documentary website created by the SNCC Legacy Project and Duke University, telling the story of the Student Nonviolent Coordinating Committee & grassroots organizing from the inside-out
We're Still Not There: A Practical Guide to Resistance on Full Frontal with Samantha Bee
"In Memory of Mattie Bivens & George Greene" by Dorie Ladner at CRMvet.org
"Honoring the Memory of Fannie Lou Hamer at NYU DC," Dorie Ladner taking part in a panel discussion after the screening of the short film This Little Light of Mine: The Legacy of Fannie Lou Hamer.

1942 births
People from Hattiesburg, Mississippi
American civil rights activists
American social workers
African-American activists
Tougaloo College alumni
People from Washington, D.C.
Living people
21st-century African-American people
20th-century African-American people